The governor of Minnesota is the head of government of the U.S. state of Minnesota, leading the state's executive branch. Forty people have been governor of Minnesota, though historically there were also three governors of Minnesota Territory. Alexander Ramsey, the first territorial governor, also served as state governor several years later.  State governors are elected to office by popular vote, but territorial governors were appointed to the office by the United States president. The current governor of Minnesota is Tim Walz of the Democratic-Farmer-Labor Party (DFL).

Powers and qualifications
Similar to the U.S. President, the governor has veto power over bills passed by the Minnesota State Legislature.  As in most states, but unlike the U.S. President, the governor can also make line-item vetoes, where specific provisions in bills can be stripped out while allowing the overall bill to be signed into law.

The governor of Minnesota must be 25 years old upon assuming office, and must have been a Minnesota resident for one year before the election.

Since a 1958 amendment to the Minnesota Constitution governors are elected to four-year terms, with no limits on the number of terms they may serve.

Cabinet

The governor has a cabinet consisting of the leaders of various state departments.  The governor appoints these department heads, who, other than the head of the Department of Military Affairs and the chairs of the Metropolitan Council and the Metropolitan Sports Facilities Commission, are called commissioners.  Cabinet members include:

Residence

The Minnesota Governor's Residence is located in Saint Paul, at 1006 Summit Avenue.

Succession

See also
List of Minnesota gubernatorial elections
List of lieutenant governors of Minnesota
Minnesota Secretary of State
Minnesota Attorney General
Minnesota State Auditor
Minnesota State Treasurer (office abolished January 6, 2003)
Politics of Minnesota
Governor's Cabinet

References

External links
Website of the governor and lieutenant governor
Minnesota Constitution, Article V 

1858 establishments in Minnesota